The Royal Regiment of Canadian Artillery is the artillery personnel branch of the Canadian Army.

History
Many of the units and batteries of the Royal Regiment of Canadian Artillery are older than the Dominion of Canada itself. The first artillery company in Canada was formed in the province of Canada (New France) in 1750.

Volunteer Canadian artillery batteries existed before 1855 but their history is mostly unknown. Seven batteries of artillery were formed after the passage of  the Militia Act of 1855 which allowed Canada to retain a paid military force of 5,000 men. One of the pre-1855 volunteer batteries formed in Saint John, New Brunswick, in 1793 was called the “Loyal Company of Artillery” and exists today as the 3rd Field Artillery Regiment, RCA.

After Confederation
On 20 October 1871, the first regular Canadian army units were created, in the form of two batteries of garrison artillery; thus, that date is considered the regiment's birthday.  "A" Battery in Kingston, Ontario, and "B" Battery in Quebec City, Quebec, became gunnery schools and performed garrison duties in their respective towns. They are still active today as part of the 1st Regiment, Royal Canadian Horse Artillery (RCHA).

The Royal Canadian Artillery was granted its ‘Royal’ prefix by Queen Victoria on May 24, 1893.

The Royal Canadian Artillery has participated in every major conflict in Canada's history.

Riel Rebellions
In 1870, in response to the Red River Rebellion led by Louis Riel, Colonel Garnet Wolseley led a force of British regulars and Canadian Militia across Northern Ontario to quell the uprising. The force never partook in any combat. Following the establishment of Manitoba in May 1870, the militia portion of the force was garrisoned along the Red River. After 1872 this included the newly formed Manitoba Demi-Battery, which was composed of Regular gunners of "A" and "B" Battery.

In 1885, when Riel led the North-West Rebellion in the District of Saskatchewan, A and B Batteries, as well as several militia batteries, including the Winnipeg Field Battery, were dispatched to quell the uprising. Upon arriving in Saskatchewan, "A" Battery and Winnipeg Field fought at Fish Creek and Batoche. "B" Battery moved west to Swift Current where they participated in the Battle of Cut Knife, which saw the first use by Canadian soldiers of the machine gun, and the last time in Canadian history that bows and arrows were used in battle.

In 1886, the Regular Gunners of A & B Batteries returned east, transferring their guns to the North-West Mounted Police.

Boer War
During the war in South Africa, Canada contributed the Brigade Division of the Canadian Field Artillery. It consisted of three batteries, named "C", "D" and "E", each of six 12-pounder field guns. Each battery consisted of three sections of two guns each, and was manned by a core of Permanent Force soldiers, with additional members from the Militia. The militia for "C" and "D" batteries came from Ontario and Winnipeg, while "E" battery had militia from Quebec, New Brunswick, and Nova Scotia.

"D" and "E" Batteries arrived in Cape Town aboard the SS Laurentian in February 1900, and were soon sent north to form part of a column based at Victoria West under Colonel Sir Charles Parsons. In March and April they took part in an operation in the Kenhardt district, covering  in six weeks, seeing little action, but much heavy rain. On 29 May, "E" battery was part of another operation under Lieutenant-General Sir Charles Warren, when it was attacked at Faber's Put. The Boers were eventually driven off, though the battery had one man killed and eight wounded. In his subsequent despatch Warren particularly mentioned "E" Battery's Major Ogilvie and Captain Mackie. By the end of June "E" Battery had been split up into sections and was stationed along the Kimberley–Mafeking Railway.

In July 1900 "D" Battery moved to Pretoria to operate in the Transvaal in a column commanded by Colonel Ian Hamilton, and saw much action, with a section particularly distinguishing itself at the battle of Leliefontein, when 100 men of the Royal Canadian Dragoons and 2nd Canadian Mounted Rifles, bolstered by a single Colt machine gun and the two 12-pounders of the battery, repelled an attack by 200 mounted Boers while covering the withdrawal of the main column. Three Victoria Crosses were won during the engagement.
 
Colonel Baden-Powell, the garrison commander at Mafeking, sent a telegram to the Canadian Government stating : Mafeking relieved today, and most grateful for invaluable assistance of Canadian Artillery, which made record march from Beira to help us. From the end of May the battery operated with Plumer's column in the Zeerust district until November, seeing action regularly.

The unit never operated as a whole, with the batteries, and sometimes even sections, operating independently, often for months at a time, and it was only reunited when it regrouped to return to Canada in June 1901.

World War I

The Canadian Artillery and the Garrison Artillery were the designations of the Non-Permanent Active Militia as of 1 January 1914. The Canadian Artillery and the Garrison Artillery were collectively re-designated the Royal Canadian Artillery on 3 June 1935.

World War II

The R.C.H.A. and R.C.A. expanded tremendously during the war to contribute the following units to the European theater:

Other regiments included the 9th Anti-Tank Regiment (Self-Propelled) (Argyll Light Infantry), RCA.

Coastal defences Pacific coast 
The RCA was also responsible for the defence of Canada on both the west and east coasts. In 1936 a review was done by Major Treatt of the Royal Artillery of the existing defences and potential sites for new forts. Efforts to improve the existing fortifications and build new ones were well underway by 1939.

There were approximately 10 armed forts and gun positions established along the Pacific west coast. The ones in the Strait of Juan de Fuca were integrated with the U.S. coastal defences. As the war progressed and the threat of attack diminished, the forts were gradually drawn down and demobilized. The last active coastal defence fort on the west coast, Fort Rodd Hill, was deactivated in 1958.

A list of forts and gun positions on the West Coast section

Korean War

Cold War
The Regular and Reserve components of the Royal Canadian Horse Artillery, Royal Canadian Artillery and Royal Canadian Garrison Artillery were collectively re-designated the Royal Regiment of Canadian Artillery on 29 October 1956.

Afghanistan
"F" Battery, 2nd Regiment, RCHA, fired the first Canadian artillery rounds in Afghanistan in February 2004 as part of Operation Athena's first rotation.  The mission was shot with a 105 mm LG1 and consisted of illumination rounds shot in a range spread to identify a potential rocket launching site used by insurgents. 

In December 2005, 1st Regiment, RCHA, conducted an inaugural firing of its first 155 mm M777 towed howitzers. The first six guns delivered were supplied by the United States Marine Corps under a foreign military sales (FMS) contract between the U.S. and Canada. The Canadian guns were first fired by "A" Battery, 1 RCHA, at CFB Shilo and then were deployed to Afghanistan in support of Operation Archer, and were put into service in the Canadian theatre of operations around Kandahar in early 2006.  This marked the first use by any nation of the M777 in combat operations. Regular RCHA units, reinforced by volunteers from Reserve units, continued to support operations until Canada completed its combat mission in Afghanistan in March 2014.

Since Afghanistan
In June 2017, the Royal Canadian Artillery Band, one of only two Regular bands in the Canadian Army, provided musical support for a contingent of the 2nd Battalion, Princess Patricia's Canadian Light Infantry which provided the Queen's Guard at Buckingham Palace, St James's Palace and the Tower of London, as well as Windsor Castle.
In October–November 2018, the Band again deployed to England to provide musical support for a contingent from the 3rd Battalion, The Royal Canadian Regiment, which provided the Queen's Guard.

Units
The Royal Regiment of Canadian Artillery is composed of both regular and reserve (militia) forces. The regular force component is composed of five units, four of which are front line operation units; of these, three are field artillery regiments while the fourth is a low level air defence unit. The fifth regular unit is the Royal Canadian Artillery School. Additionally, while the three field artillery regiments are on the RCA's order of battle, they are badged as regiments of the Royal Canadian Horse Artillery.

Regulars

Reserves

Regiments

Independent batteries

Since spring 2005, 10th Field Regiment, 26th Field Regiment and 116th Independent Field Battery have been grouped together as 38 Canadian Brigade Group's (38 CBG) Artillery Tactical Group (ATG).

Bands
Current:

Former:

Supplementary Order of Battle 
Regiments on the Supplementary Order of Battle legally exist but have no personnel or materiel.

Order of precedence
RCHA on parade with guns:

RCHA on dismounted parades:

RCA units:

Despite not being the senior component of the Canadian Army, the honour of "the right of the line" (precedence over other units), on an army parade, is held by the units of the RCHA when on parade with their guns. On dismounted parades, RCHA units take precedence over all other land force units except formed bodies of Officer Cadets of the Royal Military College of Canada representing their college. RCA units parade to the left of units of the Royal Canadian Armoured Corps.  The Royal Canadian Artillery does not carry colours. Its guns are its colours and are saluted on parade.

Affiliations
  - Royal Regiment of Artillery
  - Royal Regiment of Australian Artillery
  - Royal Regiment of New Zealand Artillery

Royal Canadian Artillery Museum

As the principal artillery museum in Canada, the Royal Canadian Artillery Museum presents, acquires, preserves, researches and interprets the contributions of the Royal Regiment of Canadian Artillery and the Canadian military to the heritage of Canada.
The museum is affiliated with: CMA,  CHIN, OMMC and Virtual Museum of Canada.

Memorials
A memorial wall and an artillery field gun, were erected on 21 September 1959 by the Royal Regiment of Canadian Artillery, which is dedicated to the memory of the members of the regiment killed in the service of Canada. It was relocated from its original location at Major's Hill Park to Green Island Park in Ottawa, Ontario and rededicated on 24 May 1998.

Recognition
The freedom of the city was accepted by the 5th (British Columbia) Field Battery, Royal Regiment of Canadian Artillery in Victoria, British Columbia on 4 November 1979.

Armoury

Popular culture

 James Doohan was a lieutenant in the 14th Field Regiment, RCA, during World War II. During D-Day he was wounded by friendly fire, and his right middle finger was amputated. He later played Montgomery Scott on Star Trek.
 The Royal Canadian Artillery is playable force featured heavily in the video game Company of Heroes: Opposing Fronts.
 The Royal Canadian Horse Artillery are playable units in the Wargame franchise in "Wargame: Airland Battle" and "Wargame: Red Dragon" by Eugen Systems.
 The Royal Canadian Artillery are also playable unites featured in both Steel Division: Normandy 44 and its sequel Steel Division 2 by Eugen Systems.

See also

 Military history of Canada
 History of the Canadian Army
 Canadian Forces
 List of armouries in Canada
 Organization of Military Museums of Canada
 Canadian Forces Land Force Command
 List of Canadian organizations with royal patronage
 Monarchy of Canada
Supplementary Order of Battle

Notes

References

Bibliography

"11th Field Artillery Regiment, Royal Regiment of Canadian Artillery : Canada's oldest artillery regiment." (Guelph, Ontario : The Regiment), 1966.
"Presence of the Royal Artillery regiment at Quebec from 1759 to 1871" (Canada. Dept. of Indian Affairs and Northern Development. National Historic Parks and Sites Br. National government publication 1978.)

External links

 Canadian Forces and Department of National Defence
 History and Uniform of the 3rd "Montreal" Field Battery, 1855 to 1970
 RCA Web Site

Canadian Armed Forces personnel branches
Organizations based in Canada with royal patronage
Administrative corps of the Canadian Army
Regiments of Canada in World War II
Artillery administrative corps